Charles I, Count of Nevers (1414 – 25 May 1464), Count of Nevers and Rethel, was the son of Philip II, Count of Nevers, and Bonne of Artois.

Towards the end of the life of Philip III, Duke of Burgundy, Charles fell under suspicion of practising witchcraft, in an effort to supplant Charles, Count of Charolais, as the heir. Charles I fled to France and died soon after.

He married Marie d'Albret, daughter of Charles II d'Albret on 11 June 1456, but had no legitimate children. He was succeeded by his brother John II.

References

Nevers, Charles I, Count of
Nevers, Charles I, Count of
Counts of Nevers
House of Valois-Burgundy-Nevers